Sha Tsui was a headland in Tsuen Wan, Hong Kong. It was situated at the west end of the old town of Tsuen Wan. The main road, Sha Tsui Road in the town centre of Tsuen Wan New Town is named after it.

Capes of Hong Kong
Tsuen Wan